The Valldemossa Charterhouse (Catalan: Cartoixa de Valldemossa, Spanish: Cartuja de Valldemosa, translatable as Carthusian Monastery of Valldemossa) is a palace in Valldemossa, Mallorca that was residence of the king Sancho of Majorca former royal residence and Royal Charterhouse (15th century).

History 
The origin of the complex dates back to the time of King James II of Majorca, who chose this exceptional place in the Sierra de Tramuntana, located more than 400 meters high, to build a palace for his son Sancho, known as the "Palace of the King Sancho". In the year 1399 Martin of Aragon yielded all the royal possessions of Valldemossa to the Carthusian monks. 
Saint Catherine of Palma, one of the Patron Saints of Mallorca, was born at the Monastery in 1533 and died in 1574.

The church, a neoclassical building decorated by great artists and craftsmen of the time, began to be built in 1751 on the primitive church erected in 1446. The complex has a cloister (one of the oldest parts of the current buildings), the old pharmacy of the Carthusians, a garden and the rooms of the Prioral Cell–chapel, former library, audience room, dormitory—where the historical and artistic legacy of the Carthusians is preserved, showing how the monks lived. These founded the Charterhouse and inhabited it until 1835, when it happened to private hands by the Ecclesiastical confiscations of Mendizábal.

After the expulsion of the monks in 1835, individual cells became available for rent. One of the cells, comprising 3 large rooms and a garden, was occupied by the composer Frédéric Chopin and the writer George Sand, with her family, during their sojourn in winter 1838–1839. In that period, Chopin completed his Preludes Op. 28 and composed the Ballade No. 2, Op. 38 in F major, the Scherzo no. 3, op. 39 in C-sharp minor, and one of the Polonaises, Op. 40; after their departure, Sand later wrote A Winter in Majorca. The "Chopin cell" has now been converted into a museum containing Chopin's Pleyel upright piano, documents, paintings and other memorabilia.

See also 
 List of music museums

References

External links 

 Visita Valldemossa's Charterhouse
 Celd 4. Chopin & George Sand Museum
 History of Real Cartuja

Carthusian monasteries in Spain
Buildings and structures in Mallorca
Monasteries in the Balearic Islands
Tourist attractions in Mallorca
Music museums
Music organisations based in Spain
Royal residences in Spain
Government buildings completed in the 14th century
Christian monasteries established in the 15th century
18th-century Roman Catholic church buildings in Spain
Kingdom of Majorca
Bien de Interés Cultural landmarks in the Balearic Islands